The 22410 / 22409 Gaya–Anand Vihar Terminal Garib Rath Express is a Superfast Express train of the Garib Rath series belonging to Indian Railways – Northern Railway zone that runs between  and  in India.

It operates as train number 22410 from Anand Vihar Terminal to Gaya and as train number 22409 in the reverse direction, serving the states of Delhi, Uttar Pradesh and Bihar. Initially the train ran from Anand Vihar Terminal to  later it extended to Gaya Junction.

It is part of the Garib Rath Express series launched by the former railway minister of India, Mr. Lalu Prasad Yadav.

Coaches
The 22410 / 09 Anand Vihar Gaya Garib Rath Express has 17 AC 3 tier & 2 End-on Generator coaches. It does not carry a pantry car.  As is customary with most train services in India, coach composition may be amended at the discretion of Indian Railways depending on demand.

Service
As the average speed of the train is above , as per Indian Railways rules, its fare includes a Superfast surcharge.

Routeing

Traction
As the route is fully electrified, a Ghaziabad-based WAP-5 locomotive powers the train for its entire journey.

Operation
22410 Anand Vihar Gaya Garib Rath Express leaves Anand Vihar Terminal every Saturday, arriving at Gaya the next day.
22409 Gaya Anand Vihar Garib Rath Express leaves Gaya every Sunday arriving Anand Vihar Terminal the next day.

References

External links

Transport in Gaya, India
Transport in Delhi
Garib Rath Express trains
Rail transport in Delhi
Rail transport in Uttar Pradesh
Rail transport in Bihar